Maicao Airport  is an airport serving the city of Maicao, in the La Guajira Department of Colombia.

The airport may be closed. Google Earth Historical Imagery shows a control tower and terminal/hangar buildings were taken down sometime during 2013 or 2014.

See also

Transport in Colombia
List of airports in Colombia

References

External links
OpenStreetMap - Maicao
OurAirports - Maicao
SkyVector - Maicao

Airports in Colombia